The Mahalakshmi temple, or Mahalaxmi Temple, is one of the most famous temples of Dahanu situated on Mumbai–Ahmedabad Highway in Dahanu area. It is dedicated to Mahalakshmi. This temple was built by Koli king Jayabha Mukne of Jawhar State in 1306 at the establishment of Jawhar. During the worship The flag of the present Raja of Mukne Dynasty of Jawhar is offered to the mother's temple.  The flag is presented by Narayan Satava, the priest of the village of Vaghadi.

The duty or responsibility of managing the temple, its activities including presiding over its rituals was bestowed upon a clan called Satav of the Malhar Koli tribe by Koli rulers of Jawhar. The current high priest of the Mahalaxmi temple is a Satav, from the Satav clan of Malhar Koli tribe. Mahalaxmi goddess is goddess of the mountains is the clan goddess of the Satav clan. Members of Satva clan are hence looked upon with respect by other clans of Malhar koli tribe and even other tribal groups as well.

Navratri Festival
During Navaratri celebrations, devotees from distant places throng to the temple, which is decorated for this occasion, to pay obeisance. They have to stand for hours in long queues holding coconuts, flowers and sweets which they offer to the goddess.

References

External links

 External website 

Temples in India
Lakshmi temples
Hindu temples in Maharashtra
Palghar district